Staroderbenovsky is a rural locality (a khutor) in Sysoyevskoye Rural Settlement, Surovikinsky District, Volgograd Oblast, Russia. The population was 38 as of 2010.

Geography 
Staroderbenovsky is located 18 km southwest of Surovikino (the district's administrative centre) by road. Sekretev is the nearest rural locality.

References 

Rural localities in Surovikinsky District